Greek Cypriot singer-songwriter Michalis Hatzigiannis has released two video albums and appeared in fifty-nine music videos, one film, one television program.

Music videos

As lead artist

As featured artist

Guest appearances

Video albums

Soundtrack contributions

Film

Television

References 

Videographies of Greek artists